Super Stickman Golf is a golf video game developed by Canadian studio Noodlecake Games and released for iOS and Android devices on June 7, 2011. A sequel entitled Super Stickman Golf 2 was later released on March 14, 2013. Following the success of the first two iterations, Noodlecake Games released Super Stickman Golf 3 on July 6, 2016. This new version included a new game mechanic where players could put spin on their shot, as well as new power-ups and hats. but the Android version of Super Stickman Golf 3 was removed from Google Play in 2021.

Critical reception
Each of the Super Stickman Golf apps has received critical acclaim. The A.V. Club gave Super Stickman Golf an A, describing it as "A no-nonsense hybrid of a platformer and a golf sim that manages to be the rare iOS game with staying power". Level7.nu rated the game 9/10, writing "Lots of tracks, great controls, fun superpowers, engaging leaderboards and great multiplayer. This is one of my favorite iPhone games of all time." Eurogamer gave the game 8 out of 10, saying "So even if golf brings out your inner chainsaw-wielding Alf Garnett, face your demons with this playful physics-based catharsis. All yours for 59p."

Super Stickman Golf 2 has a Metacritic score of 87 out of 100 based on 16 critics, indicating "generally favorable reviews".

Super Stickman Golf 3 received the Metacritic award for iOS Game of the Year in 2016, having a score of 95 out of 100 based on seven critics, indicating "universal acclaim".

References

2011 video games
2013 video games
2016 video games
Android (operating system) games
Video game sequels
IOS games
Golf video games
Video games developed in Canada
Noodlecake Games games